Richard or Dick Fisher may refer to:

 Richard Fisher Belward (1746–1803), British academic at Cambridge University (born Richard Fisher)
 Richard B. Fisher (1936–2004), American business manager
 Richard L. Fisher (1947–2012), American politician, member of the Virginia House of Delegates
 Richard R. Fisher, American astrophysicist
 Richard V. Fisher, American volcanologist.
 Richard W. Fisher (born 1949), President and CEO of the Federal Reserve Bank of Dallas
 Dick Fisher (speedway rider) (1933–1986), English speedway rider
 J. Richard Fisher (born 1943), American astronomer
 The Rich Fisher, fictional character Bron in Joseph d'Arimathie verse variant in "Fisher King" literary tradition

See also
 Dick Fisher Airport, Yamhill County, Oregon, USA. 
Richard Fischer (born 1917), Austrian footballer